Shane Getson (born in 1973) is a Canadian politician who was elected in the 2019 Alberta general election to the Legislative Assembly of Alberta representing the electoral district of Lac Ste. Anne-Parkland.
Shane Getson was elected as the Member of the Legislative Assembly for Lac Ste. Anne-Parkland on April 16, 2019.

He currently serves as deputy chair on the Standing Committee on the Alberta Heritage Savings Trust Fund and is a Member of the Standing Committees on Resource Stewardship.

Prior to serving with the Legislative Assembly, he spent 15 years in the construction industry, most recently in the position of a project director. Prior to this, he worked from 2008 to 2012 as senior manager of planning and execution for a private company in the energy sector.

He attended the Northern Alberta Institute of Technology (NAIT), where he received a diploma in civil engineering technology in 1996.

He and his wife have four children.

Getson was the 917th Member to be sworn into the Legislative Assembly of Alberta.

In September 2021, Getson criticized Alberta Health Services and their executives for not increasing capacity to handle the fourth wave of the COVID-19 pandemic. He said that the policy of vaccine passport was a distraction to keep accountability off of AHS. The timing of his comments was criticized by the opposition Alberta New Democratic Party as being "ignorant and tone deaf", saying that the governing UCP were responsible for the capacity issues. The comments were also criticized by healthcare workers on social media, which prompted Getson to apologize, stating that he made the comments "in context of the management of the organization, and its processes, not the personnel that operate [these] stations".

Getson faced criticism and calls by the opposition for his removal from caucus after he and fellow UCP MLA Grant Hunter attended a convoy protest that blockaded the Sweetgrass–Coutts Border Crossing in January 2022.

References

United Conservative Party MLAs
Living people
Year of birth uncertain
21st-century Canadian politicians
1973 births